Drei reizende Schwestern is an East German television series.

See also
List of German television series

External links
 

German-language television shows
1984 German television series debuts
1991 German television series endings
Television in East Germany